Camryn may refer to the following notable people:
Camryn Magness (born 1999), American pop singer, best known as Camryn
Camryn Grimes (born 1990), American actress
Camryn Manheim (born 1961), American actress

Fictional characters 
 Camryn Coyle, from the Netflix original series Project Mc²

See also
Cameron (given name)

English-language feminine given names